Nazarbayev University Repository (NUR) is the online archive of Nazarbayev University. 

NUR is designed to store, index, distribute, and preserve the digital materials of the University using DSpace software. The repository content and interface are in English, Kazakh and Russian.

NUR was founded on August 15, 2014, and now contains over 1800 scholarly works. Material available in the repository include: academic articles, PhD and masters dissertations and theses, conference proceedings, technical reports, books, images, and video presentations. Multiple educational institutions and organisations use he NUR including National Laboratory Astana, NU Research and Innovation, Kazakhstan National Geographic Society Corporate Fund.

References

Education in Kazakhstan